T-mobilitat is a contactless smart card automated fare collection used for payment of fares on public transport in the Barcelona metropolitan area sponsored by Generalitat de Catalunya. On January 1, 2022, the first phase of the project launched after six years of delays.

References

External links 
 

Contactless smart cards
Fare collection systems in Spain
Transport in Barcelona